Tha Hoodz in Us is a studio album by American rap group South Central Cartel featuring the Floc Gang.

Track listing 
 Betta Bring a Gun
 Cartel 4 L.
 Fuc Em Fuc Em
 Calidays
 I'm on My Way
 Pussy Ain't Free
 Hooka Hoe
 That's Me
 Westcoast Riders
 What I Cherish
 It's Alright
 P-U-SS-Y
 Fucc Yall
 Ghetto Star
 Real Gangsta Shit
 Hangin on da Blocc

2006 albums
South Central Cartel albums
Albums produced by Prodeje